Thérèse Vernet (-1846) was a French actress, widely known as Madame Albert from her marriage to Albert Rodrigues, an actor who performed under his given name. Born to an acting family, she attained fame for her grace and beauty as well as for the range of her acting skills. Besides becoming the "idol of Paris" she was also well known in the provinces due to long theatrical tours she undertook outside the capital. Ill-health compelled her to retire in 1846. In 1846 she married for the second time, to the actor and playwright Eugene Bignon (1812–1858).

References 

1800s births
1846 deaths
French stage actresses
19th-century French actresses